Diablo is an unincorporated community in Whatcom County, Washington, United States. The community, which is located on the Skagit River near the Diablo Dam, was established as a company town by Seattle City Light.

References

Unincorporated communities in Whatcom County, Washington
Unincorporated communities in Washington (state)